Brenda Beenhakker (born 18 February 1977) is a retired Dutch badminton player. She is the former European junior champion in the girls' singles event in 1995. She won Dutch National Championships for 8 times; 5 times in singles (1995, 1997, 1998, 1999, 2000) and 3 times in doubles (2005 – with Karina de Wit, 2006 & 2007 – with Judith Meulendijks).

Career 
Beenhakker surprised as a seventeen-year-old junior in 1995 by becoming women's singles Dutch national champion. When she was eleven, she became the Dutch junior champion for the first time. Hereafter several youth titles in her and higher age categories followed. A few months after her first championship with seniors in 1995, she also crowned as European Junior Champions, became the first ever Dutch to win the girls' singles title. Beenhakker played badminton for BC Smashing (Wijchen) in the Dutch premier league. She stopped playing international tournaments in April 2006, career lasting for 19 years.

The Arnhem player started badminton when she was ten years old, after having been interested in playing tennis before. Beenhakker is married, has a daughter and has been working at a childcare center in Wijchen since 2008. As of 2009/10 season, she succeeded Frans Rademaker as trainer of BC Smashing. She gives training at BECA Arnhem and BC Mariken in Nijmegen.

Achievements

European Championships 
Women's singles

European Junior Championships 
Girls' singles

IBF International
Women's singles

Women's doubles

References

External links 
 

1977 births
Living people
Sportspeople from Arnhem
Dutch female badminton players
20th-century Dutch women
20th-century Dutch people
21st-century Dutch women